Kiambu is a constituency in Kenya. It is one of twelve constituencies in Kiambu County.

References 

Constituencies in Kiambu County